Chicoreus brevifrons, common name the West Indian murex, is a species of predatory sea snail, a marine gastropod mollusk in the family Muricidae, the murex snails.

Shell description
The maximum shell length of this species is up to 150 mm.

The shell of C. brevifrons is relatively elongate, and has a typical muricid outline.  Three axial varices are present along its body whorl, and they are ornamented by characteristic expanded hollow spines. It also presents flat spiral cords in the interspaces of its surface. The anterior canal is well-developed, akin to several other Muricidae snails.

Distribution
C. brevifrons occurs in the Western Central Atlantic, from the Caribbean, the Gulf of Mexico, the Antilles to Brazil.

Ecology

Habitat
This sea snail dwells on mud flats in protected bays and lagoons. It is commonly found near oyster banks, as well as mangrove areas.

Feeding
C. brevifrons is an active predator of other molluscs such as oysters and clams.

Human uses
This sea snail is locally collected for food, and is consumed raw or boiled.
The shell is often sold as a souvenir in local markets.

References

 Rosenberg, G., F. Moretzsohn, and E. F. García. 2009. Gastropoda (Mollusca) of the Gulf of Mexico, Pp. 579–699 in Felder, D.L. and D.K. Camp (eds.), Gulf of Mexico–Origins, Waters, and Biota. Biodiversity. Texas A&M Press, College Station, Texas.
 Merle D., Garrigues B. & Pointier J.-P. (2011) Fossil and Recent Muricidae of the world. Part Muricinae. Hackenheim: Conchbooks. 648 pp. page(s): 104
Inventaire des Muricidae récoltés au cours de la campagne MADIBENTHOS du MNHN en Martinique (Antilles Françaises) et description de 12 nouvelles espèces des genres Dermomurex, Attiliosa, Acanthotrophon, Favartia, Muricopsis et Pygmaepterys (Mollusca, Gastropoda). Xenophora Taxonomy 36: 22-59

External links 
 Lamarck, [J.-B. M. de. (1822). Histoire naturelle des animaux sans vertèbres. Tome septième. Paris: published by the Author, 711 pp.]

Chicoreus
Gastropods described in 1822
Taxa named by Jean-Baptiste Lamarck